Bérault is a station on Paris Métro Line 1. It is situated at the boundary between the communes of Saint-Mandé and Vincennes. It is named after the nearby Place Bérault, which honors a former deputy mayor of Vincennes (1796–1871). It also evokes the name of Bérault Stuart d'Aubigny, a captain of the guard at the Chateau de Vincennes c. 1500.

The station was the second station to be retrofitted with platform screen doors during the automation of Line 1. The platforms were heightened on 28 and 29 July 2008 and the doors were installed in March 2009.

Station layout

Gallery

References
Roland, Gérard (2003). Stations de métro. D'Abbesses à Wagram. Éditions Bonneton.

Paris Métro stations in Vincennes
Railway stations in France opened in 1934